Pietro II Orseolo (961−1009) was the Doge of Venice from 991 to 1009.
He began the period of eastern expansion of Venice that lasted for the better part of 500 years. He secured his influence in the Dalmatian Romanized settlements from the Croats and Narentines, freed Venetia from a 50-year-old taxation to the latter, and started Venetia's expansions by conquering the islands of Lastovo (Lagosta) and Korčula (Curzola) and acquiring Dubrovnik (Ragusa).

Reign

Relations with Byzantium 
In 992 Pietro II Orseolo concluded a treaty with the Byzantine emperor Basil II to transport Byzantine troops in exchange for commercial privileges in Constantinople. His dogaressa was Maria Candiano.

Following repeated complaints by the Dalmatian city-states in 997, the Venetian fleet under Orseolo attacked the Neretvian pirates of Neretva (Narentines) on Ascension Day in 998. Pietro then took the title of Dux Dalmatianorum (Duke of the Dalmatians), associating it with his son Giovanni Orseolo.

Scorched earth policy 
On 9 May 1000 Doge Pietro II decided to finally pacify the Croatians and the Narentines during the last Croatian-Bulgarian wars, protecting Venetian trade colonies and the interests of Romanized Dalmatians. Without difficulties, his fleet of six ships scorched the entire eastern half of the Adriatic coast, with only the Neretvians offering resistance. After the Neretvians stole goods and captured forty traders from Zadar, the Doge dispatched ten ships that caught the Neretvians near the island of Kača. He captured them all and brought them triumphantly to Split. There, Neretvian emissaries requested the release of the prisoners. Pietro II agreed provided that the Neretvian Archont himself agreed to bow before him. Moreover, the Neretvians would also have to renounce the old tax that Venetia had to pay since 948, and guarantee safe passage to Venetian ships in the Adriatic.

Pietro II released all prisoners except for six Narentines, whom he kept as hostages. The mainland Narentines were thus pacified; the citizens of Korčula decided to wage war against Orseolo, but were eventually conquered. Lastovo however, continued to resist Venetian incursions. The island was infamous for being a pirate haven. In the effort to decisively quell further opposition, Pietro II ordered the evacuation of the island city. Despite continuing opposition, he eventually razed Lastovo to the ground.

At the same time that Pietro II subjugated Lastovo, the former Croatian king Svetoslav Suronja fled to Venice after being deposed by his two brothers. To bolster his weakened position, King Stephen I of Croatia married Pietro II Orseolo's daughter, Joscella (Hicela) Orseolo. Their son Peter Krešimir IV became king in Croatia in 1059.

Pietro II Orseolo was married to Maria Candiano, the daughter of doge Vitale Candiano and niece of doge Pietro IV Candiano. Ottone Orseolo succeeded his father, Pietro II, as the doge of Venice until 1026, while his grandson Peter reigned as King of Hungary. His younger son Domenico Orseolo's children settled in Ravenna and became the stem of the Orsini family.

Legacy 
The date of his victory became that of the Festa della Sensa, the Ascension Festival, the oldest festival in Venice. It was commemorated by the Doge and the bishop of Olivolo going past the Lido and blessing the waters, invoking good fortune for the Venetian navy.

References

961 births
1009 deaths
10th-century Doges of Venice
11th-century Doges of Venice
House of Orseolo
Byzantine Empire–Republic of Venice relations
Basil II